The Stell Hospital is a teaching hospital in Rueil-Malmaison. It is a teaching hospital of Sorbonne University.

It was established in August 1903 by American philanthropist Edward Tuck and is named after his wife Julia Stell.

References

External links
Stell Hospital

Hospitals in Île-de-France
Hospital buildings completed in 1903
Teaching hospitals in France
Buildings and structures in Île-de-France
Hospitals established in 1903
1903 establishments in France
20th-century architecture in France